Matt O'Toole is an actor who is best known for his role as Paul Millander in the television series CSI: Crime Scene Investigation.

Filmography

Film

Television

External links

American male film actors
American male television actors
Living people
Year of birth missing (living people)
Place of birth missing (living people)